Northrop, now a ghost town, was a small, early settlement in Washington County, Utah, United States, established in 1861 by Isaac Behunin.  It was located at the confluence of the North Fork and East Fork of the Virgin River. It was one of the settlements formed as part of the cotton growing colony in the County.

Northrop was destroyed by the Great Flood of 1862 and the settlers moved to settle on some nearby land with more space for growth and above the river floods, in what is now Springdale.

Site today
The site of Northrop was just at the confluence of the North and East Forks of the Virgin River, on the east side of the Virgin River east of Grafton. Nothing remains; the site was just beginning to be settled when it was washed away by the worst flood recorded in the Western United States.

See also

 List of ghost towns in Utah

References
 Washington County Chapter, Daughters of the Utah Pioneers, " Under Dixie Sun",  1950 with 1978 Supplement.  Page 127.
 John W. Van Cott, Utah Place Names: A Comprehensive Guide to the Origins of Geographic Names: a Compilation, University of Utah Press, 1990.

Ghost towns in Washington County, Utah
Populated places established in 1861
1861 establishments in Utah Territory
Ghost towns in Utah
Populated places disestablished in 1862
1862 disestablishments in Utah Territory